The Parklands-Turner Neighborhood Library is a branch of the District of Columbia Public Library in the Congress Heights neighborhood of Washington, D.C. It is located at 1547 Alabama Avenue SE. A small library kiosk opened in the area in 1976, and a somewhat larger facility opened in 1984, which was eventually replaced in 2009 by a new $878,000 library facility. 

The notably small 4,900-square-foot library is located in a leased space in the Shops at Parkland strip mall. In 2019, the library system conducted a study of potential sites for an expanded library in the neighborhood, and the district has budgeted money for the project for fiscal year 2022.

References

External links 

 Official website

Congress Heights
Public libraries in Washington, D.C.